Keep a Modest Head is a Canadian short documentary film, directed by Deco Dawson and released in 2012. The film is a tribute to Jean Benoît, a Canadian artist often credited as "the last surrealist".

The film premiered at the 2012 Toronto International Film Festival, where it won the Toronto International Film Festival Award for Best Canadian Short Film. TIFF subsequently named the film to its year-end Canada's Top Ten list of short films. The film was a shortlisted Canadian Screen Award finalist for Best Short Documentary Film at the 1st Canadian Screen Awards.

References

External links

2012 films
Canadian short documentary films
French-language Canadian films
2010s Canadian films
2012 short documentary films